Women's Museum Istanbul, located in Istanbul, Turkey, is an online museum devoted to the role played by women in the city.

Launched online in 2012, it is Turkey's first-ever and the world's third city museum dedicated to women.

The permanent exhibition of the Women's Museum Istanbul presents the biographies of women who chose a different lifestyle than that which was expected in their times. Short texts accompanying the installations in the permanent exhibition illustrate the social, cultural, economic and political dynamics of each life.

The Women's Museum Istanbul is currently in search of a building that would be suitable for the concept it envisages.

Gallery

References

External links
 
 Top 7 important women in Istanbul's history

Museums in Istanbul
Museums established in 2012
Virtual museums
2012 establishments in Turkey
Women's museums in Turkey